Eugène Charles Philippe Marie de Béthune-Sully (28 November 1843 – 26 March 1908) was a French equestrian. He competed in the jumping event at the 1900 Summer Olympics.

References

1843 births
1908 deaths
French male equestrians
Olympic equestrians of France
Equestrians at the 1900 Summer Olympics
Sportspeople from Loiret